Brzezie-Huby  is a village in the administrative district of Gmina Gostyń, within Gostyń County, Greater Poland Voivodeship, in west-central Poland.

References

Brzezie-Huby